Andrés Gómez was the defending champion, but lost in the first round to Jan Gunnarsson.

Yannick Noah won the title by defeating Miloslav Mečíř 6–4, 3–6, 6–2, 7–6 in the final.

Seeds

Draw

Finals

Top half

Section 1

Section 2

Bottom half

Section 3

Section 4

References

External links
 Official results archive (ATP)
 Official results archive (ITF)

Italian Open - Mens Singles
1985 Italian Open (tennis)